Derringer is a surname. Notable people with the surname include:

Henry Deringer (1786–1868), American gunsmith
John Derringer (born 1962), Canadian broadcaster
Paul Derringer (1906–1987), American baseball player
Rick Derringer (born 1947), American guitarist, vocalist, producer, and songwriter